Şanlıurfa Irrigation tunnels is the name of a major irrigation tunnel constructed in connection with the Southeastern Anatolia Project, a multi-sector integrated regional development project of Turkey. The tunnels were commissioned by the State Hydraulic Works authority (DSİ). The constructor was Eren İnşaat. The construction ended by 19 December 2005 and the tunnels were put into service.

Technical details 

The tunnels run in the Şanlıurfa Province of Turkey. The water supply is the water reservoir of Atatürk Dam on Fırat River (Euphrates). There are two parallel tunnels, the length of each being . The flow rate is   With these figures, the tunnels are the largest in the world, in terms of length and flow rate.

Service 

It is reported that the agricultural productivity  has since been tripled.

List of 50 Projects 
Turkish Chamber of Civil Engineers lists Şanlıurfa Irrigation Tunnels as one of the fifty civil engineering feats in Turkey, a list of remarkable engineering projects realized in the first 50 years of the chamber.

References 

Irrigation in Turkey
Buildings and structures in Şanlıurfa Province
Tunnels in Turkey
Water tunnels
Tunnels completed in 2005